TV Cultura or simply Cultura, is a free Brazilian public television network headquartered in São Paulo and a part of Father Anchieta Foundation, a non-profit foundation funded by the São Paulo State Government. It focuses on educational and cultural subjects but also has sports as entertainment options.

According to research by the BBC and the British institute Populus, published in 2015, TV Cultura is the second highest quality channel in the world, behind only BBC One.

History 

TV Cultura was founded in 1960 by Diários Associados and Rede de Emissoras Associadas, who also owned TV Tupi. In 1968, the São Paulo State Government bought TV Cultura from Associadas and subsequently donated the channel to Fundação Padre Anchieta ("Father Anchieta Foundation") in 1969. It is public TV Station with Educational and Cultural agenda and receives public investments by the government of São Paulo's state and it claims to have intellectual, political and administrative independence not only for TV Cultura, but also its two affiliated radio broadcasting channels, Rádio Cultura AM and Rádio Cultura FM.

Current programming 
News and current affairs
 Jornal da Cultura
 Jornal da Tarde
 Matéria de Capa
 Opinião
 Repórter Eco
 Metrópolis

Sports
 Revista do Esporte
 Novo Basquete Brasil
 IndyCar Series
 UEFA Europa League
 UEFA Europa Conference League

Talk
 Roda Viva
 Provoca

Music shows
 Sr. Brasil
 Cultura Livre
 Ensaio
 Manos e Minas
 Inglês com Música

Reality shows/Game shows
 Talentos
 Prelúdio
 Tá Certo?
 Cultura, O Musical
 Quem Sabe, Sabe! (2013)

Children's programming
 Quintal da Cultura
 PJ Masks
 Bluey
 Peppa Pig The Loud House Turma da Mônica Sésamo Os Under-Undergrounds Bubu e as Corujinhas Thomas and Friends Porto Papel Tromba Trem SOS Fada Manu O Show da Luna Kid-E-Cats Molang Boris e Rufus Sunny Bunnies Shaun the Sheep Mia and Me Power Rangers Dino Fury The Next Step Former programming 
News and current affairs
 Jornal da Cultura 60 Minutos Cultura Meio Dia Cultura Noite Diário Paulista Manhattan Connection Vox PopuliChildren's programming 
 Sítio do Picapau Amarelo (1964–1965)
 Castelo Rá-Tim-Bum Rá-Tim-Bum Ilha Rá-Tim-Bum X-Tudo Vila Sésamo Bambalalão Curumim Catavento Bambaleão e Silvana Mundo da Lua Glub Glub X-Tudo Um Menino Muito Maluquinho A Turma do Pererê De Onde Vem? Clifford the Big Red Dog Jay Jay the Jet Plane Pinky Dinky Doo Cyberchase Arthur Seven Little Monsters The Country Mouse and the City Mouse Adventures Mona the Vampire Charlie and Lola Little Bear Rupert Caillou Lunar Jim The Adventures of Tintim Doug Babar Zoboomafoo Faerie Tale Theatre Teletubbies Miss Spider's Sunny Patch Friends Timothy Goes to School Viva
 Pitágoras Harry and His Bucket Full of Dinosaurs Jakers! The Adventures of Piggley Winks Wonder Pets! Dora the Explorer The Puzzle Place Tots TV Kipper Big BagTV Series
 I Dream of Jeannie Bewitched Father Knows Best Mortified Beakman's World Flight 29 Down''

Broadcasters 
Between 1980 and 2007, TV Cultura became a strong educational television network, and several educational broadcasters across the country joined the network. In 1998, TVE Brasil, the station owned by the federal government of Brazil in Rio de Janeiro joined TV Cultura and together they formed the Public Television Network, today ABEPEC (translated from Portuguese, the Brazilian Association of Public and Educational Broadcasters). In 2007, with the creation of a public corporation, Brazil Communication Company and the creation of TV Brasil, the partnership with TV Cultura was dissolved, but the partnership was resumed two years later. From 2008 to 2012, more than half of TV Cultura's affiliates left it for TV Brasil, generating a rapid shrinkage of the network. However, the situation was reversed between 2016 and 2019. In 2013, the IBOPE index showcased that TV Cultura's had an audience growth in the daily average audience of Greater São Paulo, allowing it for its re-expansion. Currently, the station is present in 2,000 municipalities and 27 states, either through partner stations or network relays.

See also
TVE Brasil
TV Brasil

References

External links
 Official site 

Television networks in Brazil
Companies based in São Paulo
Portuguese-language television stations in Brazil
Television channels and stations established in 1969
Publicly funded broadcasters
Mass media in São Paulo
Brazilian companies established in 1969